{{Infobox software
| name = MuseScore
| logo = New Musescore logo.svg
| logo size = 180
| screenshot = MuseScore 4 in dark mode.png
| caption = MuseScore 4.0 in dark mode, showing palettes, and full screen mode
| collapsible = 
| author = Werner Schweer
| developer = The MuseScore developer community
| released = <ref name="1.0">

MuseScore is a scorewriter for Windows, macOS, and Linux supporting a wide variety of file formats and input methods. It is released as free and open-source software under the GNU General Public License. MuseScore is accompanied by a freemium mobile score viewer and playback app, and an online score-sharing platform.

History
MuseScore was created as a fork of the MusE sequencer's codebase. In 2002, Werner Schweer, one of the MusE developers, decided to remove notation support from MusE and create a stand-alone notation program from the codebase.

The MuseScore.org website was created in 2008, and quickly showed a rapidly rising number of MuseScore downloads. By December 2008, the download rate was up to 15,000 per month.

Version 0.9.5 was released in August 2009. By October 2009, MuseScore had been downloaded more than one thousand times per day. By the fourth quarter of 2010, MuseScore was being downloaded 80,000 times per month.

At the end of 2013, the project moved from SourceForge to GitHub, and continuous download statistics have not been publicly available since then, but in March 2015 a press release stated that MuseScore had been downloaded over eight million times, and in December 2016 the project stated that version 2.0.3 had been downloaded 1.9 million times in the nine months since its release.

The MuseScore company uses income from their commercial sheet music sharing service to support the development of the free notation software.

In 2017, the MuseScore company was acquired by Ultimate Guitar, which added full-time paid developers to the open source team. In April 2021, it was announced that a parent company, Muse Group, would be formed to support MuseScore, Ultimate Guitar, and other acquired properties (including Audacity). From 2021 to June 2022, the MuseScore company relocated its headquarters to Cyprus with Muse Group.

Features
MuseScore's main purpose is the creation of high-quality engraved musical scores in a "What-You-See-Is-What-You-Get" environment. It supports unlimited staves, linked parts and part extraction, tablature, MIDI input and output, percussion notation, cross-staff beaming, automatic transposition, lyrics (multiple verses), fretboard diagrams, and in general everything commonly used in sheet music. Style options to change the appearance and layout are available, and style sheets can be saved and applied to other scores. There are pre-defined templates for many types of ensembles. Functionality can be extended by making use of the many freely available plugins.

MuseScore can also play back scores through the built-in sequencer and SoundFont sample library. Multiple SoundFonts can be loaded into MuseScore's synthesizer. It includes a mixer to mute, solo, or adjust the volume of individual parts, and chorus, reverb and other effects are supported during playback. MIDI output to external devices and software synthesizers is also possible.

Supported file formats
MuseScore can import and export to many formats, though some are export only (visual representations and audio) and some are import only (native files from some other music notation programs).

MuseScore's native file formats are .mscz, a zip compressed file containing the score and other media, and .mscx, which is XML data that contains the score. The .mscz format is usually preferred, as it uses less space and can support images.

MuseScore also can import and export both compressed (.mxl) and uncompressed (.xml) MusicXML files, which allows a score to be opened up in other music notation programs (including Sibelius and Finale). It can also import and export MIDI (.mid, .midi, and .kar), which is supported by many other programs (such as Synthesia), although since MIDI is not designed for sheet music, most score notations are lost.

MuseScore can also import certain other music software's native formats, including Band-in-a-Box (.mgu and .sgu), Bagpipe Music Writer (.bww), Guitar Pro (.gtp, .gp3, .gp4, .gp5, and .gpx), Capella (must be version 2000 (3.0) or later; .cap and .capx) and Overture formats. It can also import MuseData (.md), which has been superseded by MusicXML.

Audio can be exported to WAV, FLAC, MP3, and OGG files, and graphical representations of scores can also be exported to PDF, SVG, and PNG formats, and/or printed directly.

Optical music recognition
MuseScore includes an optical music recognition feature which can convert PDFs to the native MuseScore file format, .mscz. This feature is web-based and uses the open source Audiveris project as a back-end.

Mobile player
Since May 2014 MuseScore has mobile apps available for iOS, Android and Kindle Fire which tie into the MuseScore score sharing site. The app can play scores, and allows changing of transposition and part extraction, but does not allow creating or editing scores.

Portable application
MuseScore also runs as a portable application. It can be installed onto a regular hard disk drive or stored on a removable storage device such as a CD, USB flash drive or flash card, so that it can be run on any compatible Windows computer system.

Custom fonts
In Musescore 3.6, a new notation font named Leland was introduced to the software, created by Martin Keary and Simon Smith. Its name is a reference to Leland Smith, the creator of a now defunct notation software SCORE. The same update also introduced a new typeface Edwin. It is influenced by the font New Century Schoolbook.

VST support 
In Musescore 4.0, support was added for VST3 plugins, both instruments and effects. Along with this, the Muse Group released a free orchestral plugin called Muse Sounds designed to provide more realistic playback of notation.

Versions

Development

MuseScore is free and open-source and is written mainly in C++, with the graphical user interface making use of the cross-platform Qt toolkit. Originally founded by Werner Schweer, Nicolas Froment and Thomas Bonte, the project is now headed by Martin Keary (Lead Designer) and Vasily Pereverzev (Lead Developer) with a wider community also contributing. Google Summer of Code has sponsored students to help develop MuseScore in 2013, 2014 and 2016 to 2021. The development of MuseScore takes place on GitHub.

Contributing code to MuseScore requires that contributors sign an online Contributor License Agreement.

Reception
MuseScore accumulated generally favorable reviews years after it was first launched, praising the software's relative ease of use and being a versatile free competitor to other scorewriters. Online computer magazine PC World rated it 3.5 out of 5 stars. It praised the precise control over the size and spacing of every object and the abilities to define keyboard shortcuts and to drag and drop modifiers, changing how they are played, but criticized the mouse methodology as occasionally unintuitive for not fully exploring the drag-and-drop potential. Technology news website Softpedia rated it 4.5 out of 5 stars, calling the design "well-organized" and "comprehensive" and lauding the application's customizability, ability to upload user sheet music, and support for many file formats. In its 2019 review that also scored the software 4.5 stars out of 5, TopTenReviews praised the ability to create tablature and percussion sheet music alongside traditional notation, support for hundreds of instruments, and being able to share music and interact with other composers online. Reviewing MuseScore 4.0, British magazine Music Teacher welcomed this version's improved engraving, new cloud storage, and focus on accessibility, such as allowing users to export their compositions in braille, an expanded color scheme, and keyboard navigation. It also noted the playback feature's support for VSTs, including the application's own Muse Sounds, which the magazine considered a boon to teachers who have spent years dealing with the inconveniences of exporting their compositions.

Adoption
MuseScore reported over 7,000 downloads per day in 2016. Many Linux distributions also include MuseScore in their software libraries, such as in the Ubuntu Software Center. The total number of downloads since 2017 is 12.1 million (as of December 2022).

Many educational institutions also make use of MuseScore, including Drew University and the Ionian University. The Board of Education of La Seigneurie des Milles-îles in Canada has also made MuseScore available on 10,000 computers across schools in the Milles-îles region in Québec.

Crowd-sourced engraving projects

Open Goldberg Variations
In 2011, MuseScore launched a Kickstarter campaign to create high-quality, freely available digital score and audio versions of the Goldberg Variations. The process influenced the development of MuseScore 2, with notation improvements needed in order to create a high-quality engraving of the variations. With the fundraising goal met, MuseScore developers, pianist Kimiko Ishizaka, and crowd-sourced reviewers collaborated to create an engraved score and also record a new album, both of which were released under a Creative Commons Zero license (without copyright), meaning they can be downloaded and shared freely. In 2012, at the end of the online public review process, the final engraved score was released for free on MuseScore.com, and printed and bound by GRIN in Germany. Kimiko Ishizaka's recording was released for free on BandCamp.

Open Well-Tempered Clavier
In 2013, a second successful Kickstarter funded the creation of a new edition of Bach's Well-Tempered Clavier. Once again, the score underwent public review on MuseScore.com, and was recorded by Kimiko Ishizaka, with both score and recordings released into the public domain in 2015.

Braille editions
After hearing from a blind musician who contributed to the Open WTC Kickstarter, MuseScore set up new stretch funding goals to support making music notation more accessible to blind and visually impaired musicians. Though the top goal of automatically converting all scores in the MuseScore.com library to braille was not funded, they did get funding to create braille sheet music for both the Goldberg Variations and the Well-Tempered Clavier. The digital files (for braille terminals & printers) are available for free download, like the standard scores.

OpenScore
In 2017, MuseScore and the International Music Score Library Project (IMSLP) launched a Kickstarter for OpenScore, an initiative to create MuseScore and MusicXML versions of public domain music from IMSLP's library.

As of December 2020, a number of scores have been completed, including Mozart's Jupiter Symphony, Gluck's Iphigénie en Aulide, Tchaikovsky's 1812 Overture, Holst's The Planets and around 900 songs in the OpenScore Lieder Corpus.

There are three ongoing OpenScore projects:
 OpenScore – main transcription group
 OpenScore Lieder Corpus – French, German and English song cycles (over 800 songs)
 OpenScore Braille – MusicXML score exports for conversion to Braille

Online score sharing and copyright issues
The Save Online feature of the MuseScore application allows users to publish and share their music online through MuseScore.com. Initially, MuseScore.com allowed free downloads of scores, free uploads of up to 5 scores, and unlimited uploads for paid accounts.

Starting in 2015 with MuseScore 2.0, the Start Center displays featured scores from the website. This feature is no longer present in MuseScore 4.0.

Starting in June 2019, a number of users who uploaded Disney songs were "copyright striked" by Disney. Publisher Hal Leonard was taking down original music, or arrangements of music that is in the public domain, based on song titles. MuseScore.com has since obtained permission to publicly display Disney music on the site, unblocking previously uploaded scores.

In July 2019, following complaints from some copyright holders, MuseScore.com changed its policies so only paying subscribers were allowed to download any music sheets. Since MuseScore.com did not have a "trustworthy tool to distinguish songs under copyright from songs available for distribution", this applied to all scores, even those intended for liberal sharing via a Creative Commons license.

In August and September 2019, features were added to allow works to be marked as public domain or original songs, and made available for free download.

On 19 February 2020, MuseScore.com announced that everyone could now upload an unlimited number of scores, even without being a paying subscriber. Paying subscribers still have access to other features that free accounts do not, like Track setup and downloads. MuseScore.com allows playback of a score in any browser supporting the HTML5 audio tag. A score can also be linked to YouTube, so that one may follow the sheet music while watching a video featuring that score.

In September 2021, MuseScore.com launched "Official Scores", scores licensed from sheet music publishers, available with an additional subscription.

As of December 2022, the website hosts 1.3 million scores and averages 300,000 visitors per day.

See also

 List of scorewriters
 Comparison of scorewriters
 Free and open-source software
 List of music software

References

Audio software that uses Qt
Free music software
Scorewriters
Scorewriters for Linux
Software that uses Qt
Free software programmed in C++
Cross-platform software
Cross-platform free software
Music publishing